Robin Albers (born 1956), who uses the stage name Jaydee, is a Dutch house music producer and DJ.

Biography 
After a degree in commercial studies, Albers played in the Dutch national baseball team and was triple Dutch arm-wrestling champion. Then, he started his career as DJ, and was a radio host on Dutch  music and sport programs for eleven years.

His original stage name was Jei D. In 1992, under the stage name JayDee, he released "Plastic Dreams", which reached number-one on the US Billboard Hot Dance Music/Club Play chart. The song, an instrumental, featured a prominent Hammond organ-style synthesizer melody, played in a jazzy, improvised manner. "Plastic Dreams" continues to be remixed and re-released today, mostly on unsolicited white labels. The track made the UK Singles Chart on two occasions; firstly in September 1997 when it reached number 18, and again in January 2004, when it reached number 35.

Albers created his own record label, First Impression.

Discography

Singles

References 

1958 births
Living people
Dutch DJs
Club DJs
Dutch house musicians
Dutch record producers
Epic Records artists
Rhythm King artists
Electronic dance music DJs